Ference Marton (born Ferenc Istvan Marton 7 March 1939) is a Swedish educational psychologist who is best known for introducing the distinction between deep and surface approaches to learning, and developing phenomenography as a methodology for educational research. More recently, he developed a theory of classroom learning based on establishing the prerequisites for learning conceived as the "space of learning". Marton is a professor of education at the Göteborg University.

See also
Noel Entwistle
Roger Säljö

External links
 Publications

Educational psychologists
Academic staff of the University of Gothenburg
1939 births
Living people